Yan Mayorovich Arlazorov  (August 26, 1947 – March 7, 2009) was a  Soviet and Russian theater actor, comedian and entertainer, Honored Artist of Russia (1997), winner of the All-Russian Competition of Variety Artists.

Biography
Born in a Jewish family. The family was not the only child, the younger brother   Leonid  (born March 8, 1956) — a mathematician, Candidate of Sciences.

Is he went to school, where was the first school theater in Moscow. According to him, he had a wonderful teacher who allowed her to do everything to express herself. And already from junior classes he dreamed of becoming an actor. Since he was very fat in childhood, he became involved in sports — wrestling, swimming, and tennis.

Jan graduated from the Boris Shchukin Theatre Institute, worked at the Central Children's Theater. From the late 1970s he served in the Mossovet Theatre, in the early 1990s he switched to the stage.

In the late 1990s, he conducted  broadcast People's Ambulance  on the AvtoRadio radio station.

He starred in several films. He worked in humorous  TV program  (author and presenter Regina Dubovitskaya).

In 1995, he won the Arkady Raikin  Cup at the Comedy International Festival   in Riga.

The actor wrote his monologues, as a rule, himself, but he also resorted to the help of professional variety playwrights — Anatoly Trushkin, Semyon Altov, Efim Smolin, Mariana Belenky, Alexander Dudoladov.

In 2008, President of Russia Vladimir Putin was awarded the Order of Honour.

Death
Arlazorov died on March 7, 2009, at the age of 62, after a severe and prolonged illness (cancer, according to some sources, a stomach tumor affecting the gallbladder and pancreas). The reason for the tragic outcome was Arlazorov’s unwillingness to operate   for a long time he tried to heal with starvation and went to healers. Farewell to Yan   was held at the State Variety Theater. March 11 was buried at  Vostryakovskoye Cemetery  in Moscow.

Personal life
He was married to an actress of theater and cinema Yola Sanko. Have a daughter Alyona.

References

External links
 

1947 births
2009 deaths
Male actors from Moscow
Russian male comedians
Russian radio personalities
Soviet male actors
20th-century Russian male actors
21st-century Russian male actors
Recipients of the Order of Honour (Russia)
Honored Artists of the Russian Federation
Deaths from stomach cancer
Deaths from cancer in Russia
Soviet Jews
20th-century comedians
Jewish Russian actors
Russian stand-up comedians